Agatha Christie's Partners in Crime is a 1983 British television series based on the short stories of the same name by Agatha Christie. It was directed by John A. Davis and Tony Wharmby and starred Francesca Annis and James Warwick in the leading roles of wife and husband sleuths Prudence 'Tuppence' and Tommy Beresford. Reece Dinsdale co-starred as Albert in all but two episodes.

The series follows the adventures and exploits of the Beresfords, who have recently taken over the running of a detective agency based in London. Each episode features one of the stories from the book. Among these are a quest for missing jewels, the investigation of poltergeists and a story involving poisoned chocolates.

The series followed the short stories closely with two notable exceptions: First, the detective parodies, although alluded to on occasion, were for the most part dispensed with. Secondly, the story arc of the blue Russian letters and the search for the agent known as Number 16 were also dispensed with. For this reason three chapters (The Adventure of the Sinister Stranger, Blindman's Bluff and The Man Who Was No. 16) were not adapted.

The series' original run was immediately preceded by transmission on 9 October 1983 of the same production team's adaptation of Christie's second novel The Secret Adversary, which also starred Annis and Warwick in the same roles and which acted as an introduction for viewers to Agatha Christie's Partners in Crime.

The series ran for one season between 16 October 1983 and 14 January 1984 with ten episodes. It was poorly received at the time, but was later shown in the United States, where John Tribe, the series graphic designer, won an award at the 1985 Emmy Awards for Outstanding Graphic and Title Design in recognition of the programme's title sequence. As of 2007, the series is regularly aired in the UK on the digital channel ITV3. Unavailable on DVD for a long period, it was released by Acorn Media UK on 2 September 2013.

Episodes

External links
.
Agatha Christie's Partners in Crime at Screenonline.org.

1983 British television series debuts
1984 British television series endings
1980s British drama television series
ITV television dramas
Television series by ITV Studios
London Weekend Television shows
Television shows based on works by Agatha Christie
1980s British crime television series
1980s British mystery television series
Tommy and Tuppence